The Ming–Kotte War was a military conflict between the expeditionary forces of Ming China and the Sinhalese Kotte Kingdom in the southern territories of Sri Lanka. The conflict happened when Ming China's treasure fleet returned to Sri Lanka in 1410 or 1411 and resulted in the overthrow of King Alakeshvara of the Alagakkonara feudatory, who was replaced by Parakramabahu VI of the previous royal family.

Background 
In Sri Lanka, the Alagakkonara dynasty from South India, which gained dominance in Kotte, had waged a war against the Jaffna Kingdom. In that war, Vira Alakeshvara gained military prestige. He soon came to power, ruled Kotte with a puppet king of the previous royal dynasty, and eventually usurped the throne of the kingdom. 

During the Ming treasure voyages, a large Chinese fleet, led by Admiral Zheng He, arrived into local waters to establish Chinese control and stability of the maritime routes in the waters around Ceylon and southern India. Alakeshvara posed a threat to Chinese trade by committing piracy and hostilities in the local waters.

Due to Alakeshvara's hostilities against the Chinese presence in Ceylon during the first Ming treasure voyage, Zheng decided to leave the island for other destinations. It is probable that the then-prince Parakramabahu VI or others acting on his behalf solicited aid from Zheng during this time, so the Chinese admiral adopted a hostile attitude to Alakeshvara and espoused the cause of this prince. During the third Ming treasure voyage, the Chinese fleet returned to the Kotte Kingdom. This time, the Chinese came to depose Alakeshvara by military force.  states that the confrontation against Alakeshvara in Ceylon most likely happened during the outward journey of the Chinese fleet in 1410, rather than the homeward journey in 1411, but he also notes that most authorities think that the confrontation happened during the homeward journey in 1411.

War
On their return to Ceylon, the Chinese were overbearing and contemptuous of the Sinhalese, whom they considered to be rude, disrespectful, and hostile. They also resented that the Sinhalese were committing hostilities towards neighboring countries that had diplomatic relations with Ming China. Zheng He and a contingent of 2,000 Chinese troops traveled overland into Kotte because Alakeshvara had lured them into his territory. Alakeshvara soon cut off Zheng and his troops from the Chinese treasure fleet anchored at Colombo. He planned to launch a surprise attack on the fleet.

In response, Zheng and his contingent of troops invaded Kotte and conquered its capital. They captured Alakeshvara with his family and principal officials. Hereafter, they fought their way back to the fleet for six days. The Sinhalese Army hastily returned and surrounded the capital but was repeatedly defeated in battle by the invading Chinese troops.

Aftermath

After the third Ming treasure voyage, Zheng He returned to Nanjing on 6 July 1411 and presented the Sinhalese captives to the Yongle Emperor, who eventually decided to free Alakeshvara and return him to Ceylon. 

The Chinese were allied with Parakramabahu VI and dethroned Alakeshvara in favor of him. The Yongle Emperor had requested from the Ministry of Rites to recommend someone to serve as the new king of Kotte. As documented in Chinese records, Parakramabahu VI was chosen by the Sinhalese present at the Ming court, nominated by the Ming emperor, and installed with the backing of Zheng and his fleet. By the time the Chinese embassy arrived, the previous Sinhalese dynasty had re-established itself in Kotte.  With Parakramavahu VI as the ruler in Ceylon, both economic and diplomatic relations between China and Ceylon improved. The Chinese treasure fleet experienced no hostilities during visits to Ceylon on subsequent voyages.

On 13 September 1411, the emperor granted both rewards and promotions for those who participated in the Sinhalese confrontation after the joint recommendation of the Ministry of War and the Ministry of Rites.

See also 
 Battle of Palembang (1407)

References

Citations

Sources 

 
 
 
 
 
 

Wars involving the Ming dynasty
Kingdom of Kotte
Wars involving Sri Lanka
1410s in Asia
15th century in Sri Lanka
1410 in Asia
1411 in Asia
15th century in China
Conflicts in 1410
Conflicts in 1411
Treasure voyages